Hierodula sorongana is a species of praying mantis in the family Mantidae.

Subspecies
These two subspecies belong to the species Hierodula sorongana:
 Hierodula sorongana sorongana Giglio-Tos, 1912
 Hierodula sorongana squalida Beier, 1965

References

sorongana
Articles created by Qbugbot
Insects described in 1912